Breathe In is the second single released from the debut album of the same title by English singer-songwriter Lucie Silvas. "Breathe In" outpeaked her previous single "What You're Made Of" on the UK Singles Charts by one position, reaching number six. In Ireland, however, the song was not as successful as "What You're Made Of", stalling at number 34. The song also reached number 41 in the Netherlands and number 86 in Germany.

Track listings

Credits and personnel
Credits are lifted from the UK CD1 liner notes.

Studios
 Recorded at Studio 360
 Mixed at Quad Studios (New York City)

Personnel

 Lucie Silvas – writing, vocals, background vocals
 Judie Tzuke – writing
 Graham Kearns – writing, guitars
 Mike Peden – writing, production
 Mia Silvas – background vocals
 Graham Kearns – guitars
 Paul Turner – bass

 Peter Gordeno – keyboards, piano
 Charlie Russell – drums, drum programming
 Martin Hayles – recording
 Dan Gautreau – recording assistant
 Michael H. Brauer – mixing
 Keith Gary – mixing assistant, Pro Tools engineering

Charts

Weekly charts

Year-end charts

References

Lucie Silvas songs
2005 singles
Songs written by Judie Tzuke
Songs written by Lucie Silvas
Songs written by Mike Peden